Normanellidae is a family of copepods belonging to the order Harpacticoida.

Genera:
 Normanella Brady, 1880
 Paranaiara Kihara & Huys, 2009
 Pseudocletodes Scott & Scott, 1893
 Sagamiella Lee & Huys, 1999

References

Copepods